Phostria purpureonitens is a moth in the family Crambidae. It was described by George Hampson in 1918. It is found on Woodlark Island in Papua New Guinea.

The wingspan is about 40 mm. The forewings are grey brown, glossed with brilliant purple except on the basal and costal areas. The hindwings are grey brown glossed with brilliant purple except at the base and on the inner area.

References

Phostria
Moths described in 1918
Moths of New Guinea